Zygostates is a genus of orchids widespread across much of South America from Guyana to Argentina.

The word is from the Greek ζυγοστάτης (zygostates, weigher, balance) and refers to the projections from the base of the column which resemble a balance.

References

Orchids of South America
Oncidiinae
Oncidiinae genera